"Some of These Days" is a popular song, written and composed by Shelton Brooks, published in 1910, and associated with the performer Sophie Tucker.

Background
Shelton Brooks and "Some of These Days" was brought to Sophie Tucker's attention in 1910 by her maid, who insisted she meet Brooks and hear the song. Tucker instantly recognized its hit potential, performed and recorded many versions throughout the years, and eventually it became her signature song—including landing movie appearances to perform it.

Tucker first recorded the song along with others on wax cylinder format in 1910–11.  In 1926, on 78 RPM record format and backed by Ted Lewis and his band, Tucker recorded her classic, million-selling 1926 version, which stayed in the #1 position on the charts for five weeks beginning November 23, 1926, and re-affirmed her lasting association with the song.

"Some of These Days" has been recorded by many other artists, including Ethel Waters, Louis Armstrong, Coco Briaval, Elkie Brooks, Cab Calloway, Bing Crosby, Bobby Darin, Ella Fitzgerald, Diahann Carroll, Danny Aiello, Judy Garland, Matt Forbes, The Hot Sardines, Susan Maughan, The McGuire Sisters, the Original Dixieland Jass Band, Sue Raney, Serena Ryder, Sidney Bechet, Leon Redbone, and recently by Erica Lewis with the band Tuba Skinny.

Appearances in film
"Some of These Days" made the first of many movie soundtrack appearances in Lights of New York (1928), the first "all talking" motion picture, being one of several songs played by the house band of the nightclub where the film is set. Sophie Tucker herself sang "Some of These Days" in character as a nightclub singer in the 1929 film Honky Tonk with reprise performances (as herself) in Broadway Melody of 1938 and Follow the Boys (1944).

Other films to feature the song include Scarface and Three on a Match (both 1932), both featuring actress Ann Dvorak dancing to the song: in Scarface the song is played in a nightclub by Gus Arnheim's band while in Three on a Match Dvorak dances while actor Harry Seymour plays "Some of These Days" on a piano.

In Rose-Marie (1936), Jeanette MacDonald attempts a lyric soprano rendition in a Klondike café whose regular vocalist (Gilda Gray) upstages McDonald with an earthy performance of the song. "Some of These Days" was also featured in the 1939 release Only Angels Have Wings in which Jean Arthur plays the song on the piano in a cantina.

Other soundtrack appearances of the song include:
 The song is performed in the 1930 Talkartoon cartoon Wise Flies by a villainous spider attempting to seduce a female fly. The spider's vocals are taken directly from a 1929 Eddie Peabody recording.
The 1931 film An American Tragedy features a group of young adults singing the song while lounging in canoes on a lake. The song is performed with only a guitar, while percussions are used by tapping on the canoes and body of the guitar, while the trumpet parts are scatted by some of the crowd.
 Leland Palmer, Ann Reinking and Erzsebet Foldi perform the song in the 1979 film All That Jazz.
 Calloway's recording appears on the soundtrack of Forbidden Zone (1980), with Oingo Boingo member Gene Cunningham in the role of Papa Hercules lip synching Calloway's vocals.
 The 2004 Bobby Darin biopic Beyond the Sea features the song over the end credits, performed by Kevin Spacey, who played Darin.
 Boardwalk Empire: The song was used in the pilot episode, as well as in "Belle Femme" (season 1, episode 9).
 White Collar: In the fourth season episode "Empire City", June Ellington (Diahann Carroll) sings the song during the finale.

Appearances in fiction
 The song, or a particular recording of it, is a recurrent theme in Jean-Paul Sartre's 1938 novel Nausea. Sartre imagines some details of the "Negress" who sings it, possibly Ethel Waters. He further imagines that it was composed by a "Jew with black eyebrows" rather than the actual composer, Shelton Brooks. 
 In the 1920-set HBO drama Boardwalk Empire, the 1911 version of the song by Sophie Tucker is played in the pilot episode. In the ninth episode, Sophie Tucker appears as a character (played by Kathy Brier) in a cabaret show and sings the song.
 Early in the novel Sexus by Henry Miller, the song is mentioned as being sung during a dinner celebrating a work bonus of $350.
 The song's lyrics are featured in "Batman" vol. 3 Annual 2 (2017) by Tom King.

See also
List of pre-1920 jazz standards

References

Songs written by Shelton Brooks
Cab Calloway songs
Sophie Tucker songs
1910 songs
1910s jazz standards
United States National Recording Registry recordings